Mikaela Fabricius-Bjerre ( Lindh; 17 December 1969 – 13 February 2023) was a Finnish dressage rider. She represented Finland in 2012 Summer Olympics in London finishing 30th.

Fabricius-Bjerre died from cancer on 13 February 2023, at the age of 53.

References

1969 births
2023 deaths
Sportspeople from Turku
Finnish female equestrians
Finnish dressage riders
Olympic equestrians of Finland
Equestrians at the 2012 Summer Olympics